The canton of Neufchâtel-sur-Aisne was an administrative division in northern France. It was disbanded following the French canton reorganisation which came into effect in March 2015. It consisted of 28 communes, which joined the new canton of Villeneuve-sur-Aisne in 2015. It had 10,209 inhabitants (2012).

The canton comprised the following communes:

Aguilcourt
Amifontaine
Berry-au-Bac
Bertricourt
Bouffignereux
Chaudardes
Concevreux
Condé-sur-Suippe
Évergnicourt
Gernicourt
Guignicourt
Guyencourt
Juvincourt-et-Damary
Lor
Maizy
La Malmaison
Menneville
Meurival
Muscourt
Neufchâtel-sur-Aisne
Orainville
Pignicourt
Pontavert
Prouvais
Proviseux-et-Plesnoy
Roucy
Variscourt
La Ville-aux-Bois-lès-Pontavert

Demographics

See also
Cantons of the Aisne department

References

Former cantons of Aisne
2015 disestablishments in France
States and territories disestablished in 2015